The TAM Museum, also known as the Museu Asas de um Sonho (Wings of a Dream Museum), is an aviation museum in the city of São Carlos, within the state of State of São Paulo, Brazil.

The museum was the creation of Rolim Adolfo Amaro, founder and president of TAM Airlines, and his brother João Francisco Amaro. The building is annexed to the TAM Airlines Technology Center at São Carlos Airport, in the district of Água Vermelha in São Carlos.

History 
In 1996, after finishing the restoration work on a Cessna 195, brothers Rolim Adolfo Amaro and João Francisco Amaro decided to buy some classic aircraft, and keep them near São Paulo, in order to make them available for flights on weekends with friends. However, once purchased, it was realised that the small collection could become a museum representative of the memory of aviation and the world. The brothers then decided to create the "Museu Asas de um Sonho" (Wings of a Dream Museum), that was maintained by the Education Service and Culture, a non-profit association founded by TAM on 23 December 1991, to administer the social programs of the company.

In 2006, the museum opened with 32 aircraft and was intended to have more than 80 aircraft. The opening was part of the celebrations of 150 years of the city of São Carlos.

In July 2008 the museum was closed to visitors in order to allow a complete reorganization of its installations, which included an expansion of the covered space from 9.5 thousand square metres to over 20 thousand square metres. The grand re-opening occurred in June 2010 and among the collection of 90 airplanes, held the sole surviving S.55 seaplane christened "Jahú", a F4U Corsair, a Bf 109, a Dassault Mirage III, a Brazilian aircraft Neiva Regente.

On January 29, 2016, TAM announced that the museum would be ceasing operations due to budget concerns. Closure actually happened on February 2, 2016, and on May 18, 2018, it was announced that it would be relocated close to the Brazilian Aerospace Memorial at São José dos Campos Airport, near the Embraer plant, but this never happened.

On December 16, 2019, the president of the Brazilian Aviation Institute (IBA), Francisco Lyra, announced to an audience at the opening of the São Paulo Catarina business aviation airport that his next project would be to preserve the "Asas de um Sonho" aviation museum. It was intended by the follower Latam Airlines Group to postpone the acerve to Campo de Marte Airport, which also never happened.

In March 2022, it was mistakenly reported that the museum pieces had been acquired by Helisul, an air taxi company, and would be displayed at the Foz do Iguaçu Convention Center, however the company denied the purchase, not ruling out the possibility of a future partnership.

On March 2023, Museum is reopened.

Aircraft exhibits 
Source: Ogden
The museum had 35 aircraft in a historical building measuring 450 metres long by 130 metres wide and 11 metres high. The exhibits planned to be accessible to visitors in 2010 were as follows:

Gallery

See also 

 List of aerospace museums

Notes

References 
 Ogden, Bob (2008). Aviation Museums and Collections of The Rest of the World. UK: Air-Britain. 
 Wikipedia Portuguese article

External links 

 Official Site 
 JetSite "Nostalgia"
 Arrival of the Douglas DC-3 "Rose"
 Douglas DC-3 "Rose" at the Museum of TAM
 20N101KC% 20Rose.htm Home DC-3 "Rose"

Aerospace museums in Brazil
Museums in São Paulo (state)
Museums established in 2006
TAM Airlines
São Carlos
Defunct museums